Krasnopeschany is a rural locality (a settlement) in Volzhsky Selsoviet, Narimanovsky District, Astrakhan Oblast, Russia. The population was 58 as of 2010.

Geography 
Krasnopeschany is located 29 km west of Narimanov (the district's administrative centre) by road.

References 

Rural localities in Narimanovsky District